Balapara Union is a union of Dimla Upazila in Nilphamari District, Bangladesh.

Geography

Location
North: Purba Chhatnai Union

East: Khaga Kharibari Union and Dimla Sadar Union

South: Jaldhaka Upazila

West: Gomnati uion

Demographics
According to the 2011 Bangladesh census, Balapara Union had 7,556 households and a population of 33,480.

Villages and mouzas
 Sovangonj Balapara
 Uttar Chhatnai Balapara
 Dakshin Chhatnai Balapara
 Dakshin Balapara
 Doloni Bill
 Uttar Sundarkhata
 Nij Sundarkhata
 Madhyam Sundarkhata
 Rupahara
 Dakshin Sundarkhata

Education
 Balapara ML High School
 Sundarkhata School and College
 Sundarkhata Shafikul Goni Swapon Fazil Madrasa

References

Nilphamari District
Unions of Dimla Upazila